Jack Hambidge (22 June 1907 – June 1994) was a British sprinter. He competed in the men's 200 metres at the 1928 Summer Olympics.

References

External links
 

1907 births
1994 deaths
Athletes (track and field) at the 1928 Summer Olympics
British male sprinters
Olympic athletes of Great Britain
Place of birth missing